Puchong is a major town and a parliamentary constituency in Petaling District, Selangor, Malaysia.

It is bordered by Subang Jaya in the north, Sepang and Putrajaya in the south, Seri Kembangan in the east and Putra Heights in the west.

History
The first settlers of the area were the Orang Asli community in a village known as Kampung Pulas. In 1900, heron (Malay: burung puchong) were aplenty in the area and were a staple for the Orang Asli.

However, it is believed that the area was explored by immigrants from Sumatra and Java. At first, the people worked as fish mongers, rubber tappers and miners. Due to the booming tin mining industry, immigrants from China and India were also brought in.

During the communist insurgency in 1948, all residents were resettled to an area which is known as Kampung Baru Batu 14.

During the 1980s, Puchong consisted of a single two-lane road running through estates and villages. Puchong development began circa 1985, when the mining licenses expired and infrastructure began to be built.

Since then, urbanization has occurred rapidly with many industrial parks, commercial centres and residential areas mushrooming along Jalan Puchong. Residential areas include Taman Kinrara, Bandar Bukit Puchong 2 and Bandar Kinrara.

Governance
Puchong is under the jurisdiction of four local authorities;
 5th to 7th mile stretch is under Kuala Lumpur City Hall (DBKL) jurisdiction (Seputeh)
 Kinrara, 8th to 16th mile, Taman Puchong Utama, Taman Saujana Puchong, Puchong Prima, Bukit Puchong 1, Bandar Puteri and Puchong Permai is under the Subang Jaya City Council (MBSJ) in Petaling District (Petaling subdistrict) and
 Bukit Puchong 2, 16 Sierra, Pulau Meranti, Bandar Nusaputra, Taman Putra Perdana, Taman Putra Prima, Taman Meranti Jaya and Taman Mas, is under Sepang Municipal Council (MPSepang) in Sepang District (Dengkil subdistrict).
 the remaining areas near Bandar Saujana Putra such as Taman Dagang Mas, Koi Prima and Putra Industrial Park, is under Kuala Langat Municipal Council (MPKL) in Kuala Langat District (Tanjung Dua Belas subdistrict).

The Puchong town centre (Malay: Pusat Bandar Puchong) is mostly located within MBSJ's (Subang Jaya) jurisdictional area on the Petaling District.

Demographics
As of 2010, the area of Puchong has a population of 356,125.

The following is based on Department of Statistics Malaysia 2010 census.

Politics
Representing in the Federal Parliament (Dewan Rakyat)

Representing in the State Legislative Assembly (Dewan Undangan Negeri) in Selangor

Postcodes

Commerce

Puchong has both local and foreign banks including CIMB Bank, Maybank, Public Bank, Bank Rakyat, HSBC Bank, Hong Leong Bank, Affin Bank, Alliance Bank, Bank of China, Citibank and ICBC Bank.

There is a wet market called Puteri Mart at Bandar Puteri and the Town Park where residents can shop for their groceries. Residents of Puchong can also do their shopping in Lotus's, Lotus's Bukit Puchong, OTK, IOI Mall (which has a multiplex and bowling alley), Giant, AEON, Milemia Square Mall, Heromarket Batu 14, Heromarket Meranti Jaya, Komplexs Puchong Parade and Puchong Plaza shopping malls. Bank of China (M) Bhd opened its 6th branch in Malaysia at Tower 2, PFCC, Bandar Puteri Puchong in 2012.

IOI Boulevard is one of the business centres located here with retail and office units. A similar project by S P Setia called SetiaWalk Puchong has been built. Block K of SetiaWalk (also known as SetiaWalk Mall) has a gym (Celebrity Fitness), a TGV cinema, Fun and Cheer store and a multiplex which houses a Subway outlet.

Recreation

Rakan Muda Sports Complex is a sport centre which also serves the residents of Puchong with many kinds of sports including futsal and badminton. The Ayer Hitam Forest Reserve is the remaining green lung in Puchong, it is a popular trekking spot for many active residents to enjoy nature. There are still many mining ponds around Puchong where locals engage in water sports and fishing.

There is also the Taman Wawasan Recreational Park for residents around this area. It is complete with a jogging track, basketball courts and children's playground. This is a popular location during the weekends where residents can be seen organizing activities throughout the day.

Healthcare
Private hospitals Columbia Asia Hospital and KPMC Puchong Medical Centre are both located at Bandar Puteri Puchong.

A public government clinic is located at Puchong Batu 14.

IMU Chiropractic Clinic is a Healthcare centre located at Ground Floor of Setiawalk, Pusat Bandar Puchong.

Education

Primary schools

SK Puchong
SK Puchong Perdana
SK Bukit Kuchai
SK Puchong Utama
SK Puchong Utama 2
SK Seksyen 1 Bandar Kinrara
SK Seksyen 2 Bandar Kinrara
SK Puchong Indah
SK Pusat Bandar Puchong 1
SK Pusat Bandar Puchong 2
SK Pulau Meranti
SK Taman Putra Perdana 1
SK Taman Putra Perdana 2
SK Saujana Puchong
SK Puchong Jaya

Chinese Primary School

SJK(C) Han Ming
SJK(C) Yak Chee
SJK(C) Sin Ming
SJK(C) Shin Cheng (Harcroft)
SJK(C) Kheng Chee

Tamil Primary Schools

SJK(T) Puchong
SJK(T) Castlefield
SJK(T) Kinrara

International and Private Schools

Rafflesia International School
Sekolah Rendah Rafflesia (Primary)
Taylor's International School
British Circle Academy
Axcel Campus
Regent International School, Puchong
Inspiros International School
RightBridge Academy
Aletheia Resource Center
MAHSA International School (located in Bandar Saujana Putra, Kuala Langat, on the other side of Puchong)

Secondary schools

Rafflesia International School
Taylor's International School
SMK Puchong Utama (1) 
SMK Puchong Batu 14
SMK Puchong Perdana
SMK Puchong Permai
Sekolah Menengah Islam Puchong
SMK Pusat Bandar Puchong 1
SMK Bandar Puchong Jaya A
SMK Bandar Puchong Jaya B
 SMK Seksyen 1 Bandar Kinrara
SMK Seksyen 3 Bandar Kinrara
SMK Seksyen 4 Bandar Kinrara.
SMK Batu 8
SMK Putra Perdana

Higher education

RIMA International College (specialize in LCCI courses, Business programmes from Heriot-Watt, Bioscience, Hotel Management programme from CTH (endorsed by Gordon Ramsay))
Binary University College (specializes in management and entrepreneurship courses)
Putra Intelek International College (located in Bandar Puteri 5, Puchong, they are specialized in Risk Management, Information Technology, Business Management, Accounting and Finance and Forensic Accounting)
MAHSA University (located in Bandar Saujana Putra, Kuala Langat, on the other side of Puchong)

Transport

Expressways/Highways
The main thoroughfare through Puchong is the Damansara–Puchong Expressway which links this town all the way to Kepong. Another route, the Shah Alam Expressway connects Puchong to Port Klang, Shah Alam, Subang Jaya and Sri Petaling.

Other highways include:

North–South Expressway Central Link highway , which connects between Shah Alam, Putra Heights, Bandar Saujana Putra, Kuala Lumpur International Airport and Nilai, accessible through Jalan Kampung Lombong in Taman Mas/Taman Putra Prima or Jalan Puchong–Dengkil in Bandar Nusaputra/Putra Perdana.
Putrajaya Link , which connects between Putrajaya and Cyberjaya, accessible through Jalan Puchong–Dengkil in Bandar Nusaputra/Putra Perdana.
South Klang Valley Expressway connects Puchong to Pulau Indah, Banting and Kajang, accessible through Damansara–Puchong Expressway or Jalan Kampung Lombong in Taman Mas/Taman Putra Prima.

Roads 
Bukit Jalil Highway Federal Route 217, connects from Bandar Kinrara to Bukit Jalil and Malaysia Technology Park.
Jalan Puchong–Petaling Jaya (Selangor state highway B11) connects from Petaling Jaya or Old Klang Road areas to Bandar Kinrara in Puchong.
Jalan Puchong–Dengkil (Selangor state highway B15) connects from Bandar Puteri Puchong to Cyberjaya and Putrajaya Link, including Puchong suburbs of Taman Putra Perdana, Pulau Meranti, Bandar Bukit Puchong, Taman Meranti Jaya and Puchong Utama.
Shah Alam–Puchong Highway (Federal route 3214) connects from Puchong Barat to Shah Alam, Alam Megah (Section 26/27/28), Putra Heights and USJ/Subang Jaya (Persiaran Kewajipan).
Lingkaran Putra Prima connects from Taman Meranti Jaya to several Puchong suburbs such as Puchong Utama, Taman Puchong Tekali, Taman Tasik Prima, Kampung Seri Aman, Taman Mas Sepang, Taman Putra Prima, Putra Industrial Park, Koi Prima and Bandar Saujana Putra. This road can be used as a transit route towards ELITE or SKVE expressways through Jalan Kampung Lombong.

Bus
There are also bus services connecting Puchong to Kuala Lumpur, Subang Jaya, Bandar Sunway, Petaling Jaya, Putrajaya and Cyberjaya.

Bus services are provided by RapidKL and Causeway Link (based in Johor Bahru) which have routes along Jalan Puchong, Jalan Klang Lama and Damansara–Puchong Expressway to various destinations around Klang Valley. Taman Kinrara, one of the nearest housing estates to the city, is only about 30 metres from the border between Selangor and Kuala Lumpur.

Bus routes 
503:  Putrajaya Sentral - Taman Puchong Utama via Cyberjaya and Taman Putra Perdana (operated by Causeway Link)
506: Bandar Utama bus hub -  Putrajaya Sentral via Damansara–Puchong Expressway and Pusat Bandar Puchong (operated by RapidKL)
600: Taman Puchong Utama - Pasar Seni via Damansara–Puchong Expressway (operated by RapidKL)
601: Taman Putra Perdana - Pasar Seni via Batu 14 Puchong and Bandar Puteri Puchong (operated by Causeway Link)
602: Taman Puchong Prima -   IOI Puchong Jaya LRT station via Puchong Perdana (operated by RapidKL)
604: Taman Saujana Puchong - Pasar Seni via Batu 14 Puchong and Bandar Puteri Puchong (operated by Causeway Link)
608: Pulau Meranti -   IOI Puchong Jaya LRT station via Puchong Utama, Batu 14 Puchong and Bandar Puteri Puchong (operated by Causeway Link)
T600:  IOI Puchong Jaya LRT station - Taman Wawasan (operated by RapidKL)
T601:   Puchong Prima LRT station - Puchong Utama (operated by RapidKL)
T602: Taman Puchong Utama - Taman Saujana Puchong (operated by RapidKL)
T603:   Puchong Prima LRT station - Taman Mas Sepang / Taman Putra Prima (operated by RapidKL)
T604:   Taman Perindustrian Puchong LRT station - Taman Sri Puchong (operated by RapidKL)
T605: Taman Puchong Utama -   IOI Puchong Jaya LRT station via Batu 14 and Bandar Puteri Puchong (operated by RapidKL)
SJ02:  SS18 LRT station, Subang Jaya -   Pusat Bandar Puchong LRT station via Sunway Pyramid (operated by Smart Selangor Bus)
SJ03:   Kinrara BK5 LRT station - Bandar Puchong Jaya (operated by Smart Selangor Bus)

Light Rail Transit (LRT)
Under the LRT Extension Project (LEP), the  Sri Petaling Line is now extended into Puchong constituency with the addition of nine new stations, namely:
  Alam Sutera;
  Kinrara BK 5;
  IOI Puchong Jaya;
  Pusat Bandar Puchong;
  Taman Perindustrian Puchong;
  Bandar Puteri;
  Puchong Perdana;
  Puchong Prima; and
  Putra Heights.

Putra Heights station is the second interchange of the Sri Petaling Line with the  Kelana Jaya Line; the other being  Masjid Jamek station. This allows residents in Puchong and Subang Jaya to travel to Kuala Lumpur city centre, Petaling Jaya, Ampang, Wangsa Maju and even Gombak while avoiding traffic congestion.

Mass Rapid Transit (MRT)
The  16 Sierra station of Klang Valley MRT Putrajaya Line will be located between the 16 Sierra and Pulau Meranti suburbs of Puchong. The 16 Sierra MRT station is expected to complete and start operation in January 2023.

References

External links

Puchong.co

Petaling District
Towns in Selangor